

Luutnantti (from French lieutenant originally meaning second-in-command) is a Finnish military rank.

Finland 
The Finnish Army is bilingual; the rank is known in Swedish as Löjtnant and Finnish as Luutnantti.

One year of conscript training as officer cadet and a three-year degree of Bachelor of Military Science at National Defence University. After 3-4 years and further studies, they can be promoted to Yliluutnantti/Premiärlöjtnant. Reservists may be promoted to lieutenants after a specified period of successful reservist training.

See also 
 Finnish military ranks

References

External links 
 Officer Training

Military ranks of Finland